Final league standings for the 1937-38 St. Louis Soccer League.

League standings

Top Goal Scorers

External links
St. Louis Soccer Leagues (RSSSF)
The Year in American Soccer - 1938

1937-38
1937–38 domestic association football leagues
1937–38 in American soccer
St Louis
St Louis